The Mixed 4 x 50 metre freestyle relay – 20 points swimming event at the 2020 Paralympic Games took place on 26 August 2021, at the Tokyo Aquatics Centre.

Competition format
Each event consists of two rounds: heats and final. The top eight teams overall in the heats progressed to the final. Relay teams consist of two men and two women, and are based on a point score. The sport class of an individual swimmer is worth the actual number value i.e. sport class S6 is worth six points, sport class SB12 is worth twelve points, and so on. The total of all the competitors must add up to 20 points or less.

Records
Prior to this competition, the existing world and Olympic records were as follows.

Heats

The swimmers with the top 8 times, regardless of heat, advanced to the final.

Final

References

Swimming at the 2020 Summer Paralympics